Nureni Gbadamosi (born 26 December 1947) is a Nigerian boxer. He competed in the men's bantamweight event at the 1980 Summer Olympics. At the 1980 Summer Olympics, he lost to Michael Anthony of Guyana.

References

1947 births
Living people
Nigerian male boxers
Olympic boxers of Nigeria
Boxers at the 1980 Summer Olympics
Place of birth missing (living people)
Bantamweight boxers
20th-century Nigerian people